Olivia McIsaac (born October 30, 2001) is a Canadian former competitive ice dancer. With her former skating partner, Corey Circelli, she is the 2020 Canadian national junior bronze medalist. With her former skating partner, Elliott Graham, she is the 2018 Canadian national junior silver medalist and finished in the top 12 at the 2018 World Junior Championships.

Personal life 
McIsaac was born on October 30, 2001 in Oakville, Ontario. Her mother, Clare Kelly McIsaac, was a competitive figure skater at the senior level internationally for Canada. McIsaac has a younger sister named Rachel. She looks up to fellow Canadian ice dancers Marjorie Lajoie / Zachary Lagha. McIsaac competed in gymnastics when she was young. She is currently a student at Queen's University at Kingston.

Career

Early career 
McIsaac began skating in 2005, after her mother put her on the ice as a toddler. She trained in ladies' singles with her mother and Shelley Barnett as her coaches. McIsaac began competing simultaneously in ice dance after teaming up with Scott Norton during the 2015–16 season to compete on the intermediate level. She competed with Liam MacDonald the following season, finishing 11th at the novice level at the 2017 Canadian Championships.

2017–2018 season 
McIsaac quit singles in 2017 to focus on training ice dance full-time. She teamed up with Elliott Graham and moved to train with his coaches at the Mariposa School of Skating in Barrie, Ontario. McIsaac/Graham made their junior international debut at 2017 JGP Poland, where they finished fourth. They then won Sectionals and medaled at Skate Canada Challenge to qualify to the 2018 Canadian Championships. At Canadian Championships, McIsaac/Graham won the silver medal behind Marjorie Lajoie / Zachary Lagha and were named to the team for Junior Worlds in their first season as a team.

At the 2018 World Junior Championships, McIsaac/Graham finished 12th in the short dance and 14th in the free dance to finish 12th overall. Graham ended the partnership at the end of the season.

2018–2019 season 
In 2018, McIsaac teamed up with Corey Circelli and relocated to the Toronto Cricket, Skating and Curling Club, where he trained in singles alongside ice dance. They made their international debut at 2018 JGP Czech Republic, where they finished seventh. At the 2019 Canadian Championships, McIsaac/Graham finished eighth.

2019–2020 season 
McIsaac/Circelli were assigned to 2019 JGP France and 2019 JGP Italy, where they finished ninth and 12th, respectively. They earned their first national medal at the 2020 Canadian Championships, winning the junior bronze behind Emmy Bronsard / Aissa Bouaraguia and Nadiia Bashynska / Peter Beaumont.

On May 16, 2020, McIsaac announced her retirement from the sport.

Programs

With Circelli

With Graham

Competitive highlights 
JGP: Junior Grand Prix.

With Circelli

With Graham

Detailed results 
ISU personal bests highlighted in bold.

With Circelli

With Graham

References

External links 
 
 

2001 births
Living people
Canadian female ice dancers
Sportspeople from Burlington, Ontario
Sportspeople from Oakville, Ontario